The following highways are numbered 306:

Canada
 Nova Scotia Route 306
 Prince Edward Island Route 306
 Saskatchewan Highway 306

China
 China National Highway 306

Costa Rica
 National Route 306

Hungary
 Main road 306 (Hungary)

India
 National Highway 306 (India)

Japan
 Japan National Route 306

Philippines
 N306 highway (Philippines)

United States
  Arkansas Highway 306
  Florida State Road 306 (former)
  Georgia State Route 306
  Iowa Highway 306 (former)
  Kentucky Route 306
  Louisiana Highway 306
  Maryland Route 306
  Mississippi Highway 306
  Montana Secondary Highway 306
  Nevada State Route 306
 New York:
  New York State Route 306
 County Route 306 (Albany County, New York)
  County Route 306 (Erie County, New York)
  North Carolina Highway 306
  Ohio State Route 306
  Tennessee State Route 306
  Texas State Highway 306 (former)
  Texas State Highway Loop 306
  Farm to Market Road 306
  Utah State Route 306
  Virginia State Route 306
  Washington State Route 306 (former)

Other areas:
  Puerto Rico Highway 306
  U.S. Virgin Islands Highway 306